The twenty-second season of Geordie Shore, a British television show based in Newcastle upon Tyne, began airing on 5 October 2021. The announcement of this series replaced the show's tenth anniversary reunion series that was due to be set in Colombia, but was delayed in November 2020, and again in January 2021, before being postponed entirely due to travel restrictions thanks to the COVID-19 pandemic and continued UK restrictions. Before filming began in June 2021, the cast had to be quarantined for ten days. This season features a dating show format, where the current cast were joined by a number of new single cast members and sent on dates with them, with an added twist of eliminations for those who fail to make romantic connections. It also includes the return of Marty McKenna, who made his last appearance in the fifteenth season.

Cast 
 Chloe Ferry
 Nathan Henry

 Bethan Kershaw
 James Tindale

 Louis Shaw
 Marty McKenna
 Abbie Holborn
 Amelia Lily
 Anthony Kennedy

Dates
 Aaron Fare
 Anya Brokman
 Brandon Henderson
 Charlie Wheeler
 Chloe Adams
 Darcy Philip
 Devon Nathaniel Reid
 Harrison Campbell
 India-Jane Wilkinson
 Jack Roberts
 Jade Affleck
 Jay Baker
 Josh Mather
 Kelsey Wright
 Kyle Tyler Lunn
 Molly Godfrey
 Nathanial Valentino
 Niko Kaim
 Robbie McMahon
 Robyn Mukoyi
 Roxy Johnson
 Ruby Torry
 Ryan Taylor

Duration of cast 

  = Cast member is featured in this episode.
  = Cast member arrives in the house.
  = Cast member returns to the series.
 = Cast member returns to the house.
 = Cast member does not feature in this episode.
 = Cast member leaves the series.
  = Cast member is not officially a cast member in this episode.

Episodes

Ratings

References 

Geordie Shore
2021 British television seasons
British dating and relationship reality television series